Wilhelm Christian Raster was a German administrative officer (Verwaltungsbeamter) in the Duchy of Anhalt-Dessau in the first half of the 19th century. He served as the Collector of Customs and Excise for the Duchy and maintained a close relationship with Duke Leopold IV. Raster had a passion for languages (himself being fluent in four) and was noted for translating a number of Lord Byron's works from English into German. He had a friendship with the poet Friedrich von Matthisson, which was said to have a profound effect on his son, Hermann. The elder Raster encouraged his son to study philology and linguistics at the universities in Leipzig and Berlin. Despite his linguistically-oriented education, the younger Raster eventually went into politics and journalism and immigrated to the United States following his participation in the Revolutions of 1848.

References

1776 births
Year of death missing
People from Anhalt-Dessau
19th-century translators
English–German translators
19th-century German civil servants